The American Southwest Conference men's basketball tournament is the annual conference basketball championship tournament for the NCAA Division III American Southwest Conference. The tournament has been held annually since 1999. It is a single-elimination tournament and seeding is based on regular season records.

The winner, declared conference champion, receives the ASC's automatic bid to the NCAA Men's Division III Basketball Championship.

Results

Championship records

Belhaven, Dallas, Centenary, Schreiner, Texas Lutheran, and Texas–Tyler never reached the tournament finals before departing the ASC
 Schools highlighted in pink are former members of the American Southwest Conference

References

NCAA Division III men's basketball conference tournaments
Tournament
Recurring sporting events established in 1999